Sordo River is a river of eastern Mexico. It flows through the municipality of Xalapa, in the state of Veracruz.

References

Rivers of Veracruz
Xalapa